Clifford Chance LLP is an international law firm headquartered in London, United Kingdom, and a member of the "Magic Circle", a group of London-based multinational law firms. It ranks as one of top ten largest law firms in the world measured both by number of lawyers and revenue.

According to Acuris, as of 2020 Clifford Chance secured the most European M&A mandates, becoming the most popular adviser to top-tier private equity clients in the continent. In the same year it was named International Law Firm of the Year at the International Financial Law Review (IFLR) Europe Awards, part of the Euromoney group.

History

Clifford Chance was formed by the merger of two London-based law firms. The first was Coward Chance, which derived from a firm established in 1802 by Anthony Brown, a fishmonger's son. Brown's firm became embroiled in the Panic of 1825, caused by speculation in South American investments, including the non-existent country of Poyais, invented by Scottish soldier Gregor MacGregor. One of the firm's longest clients was Cecil Rhodes. The firm advised him on his diamond mining business in South Africa, administered his estate after his death and helped set up the Rhodes Scholarships. Another client was Guglielmo Marconi. It also helped Midland Bank recover assets in Russia after the 1917 revolution, and advised the state government of Hyderabad on the preparation for Indian independence.

The second firm was Clifford-Turner, founded in 1900 by Harry Clifford Turner, with offices on Gresham Street, EC2. Its clients included Dunlop Rubber Company and Imperial Airways. In 1929, Clifford-Turner advised and witnessed the creation of John Lewis Partnership. After the Second World War it advised the Labour government on the nationalisation of several privately owned industries. It opened offices in Paris in 1961, Amsterdam in 1972, Madrid in 1980 and New York in 1986.

The merger of Clifford-Turner and Coward Chance in 1987 led to the formation of Clifford Chance. Neither Clifford-Turner nor Coward Chance were first-rank London law firms, but their merger has since been said to have changed the shape and profile of law firms in London and globally. Over the next decade the firm expanded its practices across Europe and Asia and more than doubled in size. In 1992 Clifford Chance became the first major non-US firm to practice US law.

In 1999, Clifford Chance merged with Frankfurt-based law firm Pünder, Volhard, Weber & Axster and with the 1871-established US-based firm Rogers & Wells (the use of the Pünder, Volhard, Weber & Axster and Rogers & Wells branding for their respective European and United States regional offices was discontinued in 2003). In 2002, Clifford Chance launched in California, setting up a branch with nearly 50 attorneys from the disbanding dot-com firm Brobeck, Phleger & Harrison in Los Angeles, Palo Alto, San Diego and San Francisco. With California's downturn, the firm closed its Pacific Coast operations in 2007.

Clifford Chance was one of several international law firms that developed local law practices in Japan following the easing of restrictions on foreign law firms in 2005. Although its Magic Circle competitors Allen & Overy and Linklaters significantly downsized this segment of their practice following the 2008 financial crisis, the Tokyo office of Clifford Chance maintains a local law practice, even handling local matters for Japanese clients, and views this capability as critical for an international law firm. Clifford Chance was the highest-ranked European law firm by Japanese corporate legal departments in a December 2013 Nihon Keizai Shimbun survey.

Like other firms in the Magic Circle, the firm lost significant revenue during the late-2000s recession, with its profit dropping by 33.4% in the 2008-9 financial year.  As part of cost cutting in response to the recession, in 2009 Clifford Chance announced plans to lay off 80 lawyers and 115 support staff in London. In addition, the firm accepted the redundancy applications of 50 fee earners in London over and above the initial 80 lawyers. In 2011, the firm moved back office tasks to its 350-employee Global Shared Service Centre, including a 60-employee Knowledge Centre in New Delhi, India as an efficiency measure.

In May 2011, Clifford Chance opened offices in Australia by merging with two M&A boutique law firms, Sydney-based Chang, Pistilli & Simmons and Perth-based Cochrane Lishman Carson Luscombe. In February 2012, Clifford Chance opened a new office in Casablanca, giving the firm's Africa practice its first permanent on the ground presence in the continent. In July 2012, Clifford Chance became the first UK firm to receive permission from South Korea's Ministry of Justice to open an office in the country.

In November 2011 it was identified as the largest supplier to the City of London Corporation, having received over £9m in fees from the corporation between January and September of that year. In February 2018, following the January 2018 liquidation of construction and services business Carillion, around 60 staff at Carillion's Newcastle-based legal services arm joined Clifford Chance. On 2 May 2018, Clifford Chance announced the establishment of a delivery and innovation hub in Singapore to serve the Asia-Pacific Region.

Offices 
The firm maintains offices in the following cities:

 London (global headquarters)
 Abu Dhabi
 Amsterdam
 Barcelona
 Beijing
 Brussels
 Bucharest
 Casablanca
 Dubai
 Düsseldorf
 Eschborn
 Frankfurt
 Hong Kong
 Istanbul
 Luxembourg
 Madrid
 Milan
 Munich
 Newcastle upon Tyne
 New Delhi
 New York
 Paris
 Perth
 Prague
 Rome
 São Paulo
 Seoul
 Shanghai
 Singapore
 Sydney
 Tokyo
 Warsaw
 Washington, D.C.

See also
List of largest law firms by profits per partner

References

Further reading
Scott, John (1980). Clifford-Turner. Legibus.
Slinn, Judy (1993). Clifford Chance: Its Origins and Development. Granta Editions.
Bose, Mihir, 'Clifford Chance: A Very Peculiar Practice?', Director, March 1990, pp. 65–66, 68, 70.
'Playing for Stakes: The Game of Clifford Chance', Legal Business, June 1993, pp. 28–31.
'London Braces for the Big Six Invasion', American Lawyer, December 1996, pp. 5–6.
Rose, Craig, 'Clifford Chance: The Merger That Worked', Commercial Lawyer, Issue 15, 1997, pp. 32–34.
Morris, John E., 'The New World Order', American Lawyer, August 1999, pp. 92–99.
'Merger in the First Degree: British Law Firms Are Forging New Relationships That Could Transform the Style of Global Legal Practice', Time International, 9 August 1999, p. 41.
Steinberger, Mike, 'Is Clifford Chance/Rogers & Wells the Next Wave, or Simply Overkill?', Investment Dealers' Digest, 9 August 1999, pp. 12–13.

External links
Clifford Chance LLP

Law firms of the United Kingdom
Foreign law firms with offices in Hong Kong
Foreign law firms with offices in Japan
Foreign law firms with offices in the Netherlands
Foreign law firms with offices in the United States
Law firms established in 1987
1987 establishments in England